Edward Young (June 13, 1913 – August 3, 1967), nicknamed "Pep", was an American Negro league first baseman who played in the 1930s and 1940s. 

A native of Greenwood, Mississippi, Young made his Negro leagues debut in 1938 with the Chicago American Giants. He played eight seasons with Chicago, and also played for the Homestead Grays in 1947. Young died on August 3, 1967, at the age of 54.

References

External links
 and Seamheads

1913 births 
1967 deaths
Baseball first basemen
Baseball players from Mississippi
Chicago American Giants players
Homestead Grays players
People from Greenwood, Mississippi